Seine Normandie Agglomération is the communauté d'agglomération, an intercommunal structure, centred on the town of Vernon. It is located in the Eure department, in the Normandy region, northwestern France. Created in 2017, its seat is in Vernon. Its area is 660.1 km2. Its population was 82,408 in 2019, of which 23,727 in Vernon proper.

Composition
The communauté d'agglomération consists of the following 61 communes:

Aigleville
Les Andelys
Bois-Jérôme-Saint-Ouen
Boisset-les-Prévanches
La Boissière
Bouafles
Breuilpont
Bueil
Caillouet-Orgeville
Chaignes
Chambray
La Chapelle-Longueville
Le Cormier
Croisy-sur-Eure
Cuverville
Daubeuf-près-Vatteville
Douains
Écouis
Fains
Frenelles-en-Vexin
Gadencourt
Gasny
Giverny
Guiseniers
Hardencourt-Cocherel
Harquency
Hécourt
Hennezis
Heubécourt-Haricourt
La Heunière
Heuqueville
Houlbec-Cocherel
Ménilles
Mercey
Merey
Mesnil-Verclives
Mézières-en-Vexin
Muids
Neuilly
Notre-Dame-de-l'Isle
Pacy-sur-Eure
Le Plessis-Hébert
Port-Mort
Pressagny-l'Orgueilleux
La Roquette
Rouvray
Sainte-Colombe-près-Vernon
Sainte-Geneviève-lès-Gasny
Saint-Marcel
Saint-Vincent-des-Bois
Suzay
Le Thuit
Tilly
Vatteville
Vaux-sur-Eure
Vernon
Vexin-sur-Epte
Vézillon
Villegats
Villez-sous-Bailleul
Villiers-en-Désœuvre

References

Agglomeration communities in France
Intercommunalities of Eure